Simon Lefebvre (born 6 May 1997) is a French footballer who plays as a goalkeeper for AS Muret.

Career

Europe
Lefebvre joined the Bordeaux academy in 2010, where he played until 2016. Lefebvre appeared on the bench twice for the first team in August 2015, but never made a first team appearance.

Following his release from Bordeaux and a trial with Birmingham City, on 25 July 2016 Lefebvre joined National League side Forest Green Rovers on a two-year deal. On 1 December 2016, he made a one-month loan to fellow National League side Bishop's Stortford.
Lefebvre left Forest Green on 25 July 2017, without making a first team appearance for the club.

United States
In 2018, Lefebvre moved to the United States to play college soccer at Temple University. In two seasons with the Owls, Lefebvre made 35 appearances and in 2019, he was named All-AAC Second Team.

Whilst at college, Lefebvre also spent time with USL League Two side Reading United AC, where he made a single regular season appearance for them, as well as four appearances in the play-offs.

On 9 January 2020, Lefebvre was drafted 21st overall in the 2020 MLS SuperDraft by D.C. United. On 3 March 2020, he signed with D.C. United's USL Championship affiliate side Loudoun United.
He made his debut for Loudoun on 23 August 2020, starting against Hartford Athletic, a game that ended in a 2–2 draw.

Lefebvre signed with Louisville City FC on 5 January 2021.

In September 2021, Lefebvre reunited with Brendan Burke, his coach at Reading United, by joining Colorado Springs Switchbacks FC on a loan deal.

Following the 2021 season, Louisville opted to decline their contract option on Lefebvre.

References

External links
Simon Lefebvre - Men's Soccer at Temple Owls men's soccer

1997 births
Living people
Association football goalkeepers
Bishop's Stortford F.C. players
Colorado Springs Switchbacks FC players
D.C. United draft picks
Expatriate soccer players in the United States
FC Girondins de Bordeaux players
Forest Green Rovers F.C. players
French expatriate footballers
French expatriate sportspeople in England
French expatriate sportspeople in the United States
French footballers
Loudoun United FC players
Louisville City FC players
National League (English football) players
Reading United A.C. players
Temple Owls men's soccer players
USL Championship players
USL League Two players